Saint Joseph College is a college located at Tomas Oppus Street, Maasin, Southern Leyte, Philippines. It was established in 1928 and is a member of the Commission on Higher Education (Philippines) (CHED),  through the Federation of Accrediting Agencies of the Philippines (FAAP) and the Philippine Accrediting Association of Schools, Colleges and Universities (PAASCU). and it is recognized as one of the oldest Catholic Colleges in the Philippines (formerly Saint Joseph Junior College, 1947–48).

The College provides education at the undergraduate and graduate levels, offering degrees in various majors, special course offerings and certificates, affiliated and pre-professional programs through its School of Arts and Sciences and its School of Professional and Graduate Studies. The Students are called Josephinians.

Academic programs
Master's degree
 Master in Business Administration G.R. No. 009 s. 1996 - DRO
 Master of Arts in Education G.R. No. 028 s. 1988 - DCO

Bachelor's degree
 Bachelor of Arts in Economics G.R. No. 274 s. 1960 - DCO
 Bachelor of Arts in English Language G.R. No. 274 s. 1960 - DCO
 Bachelor of Arts in Preparatory Law
 B. in Elementary Education G.R. No. 161 s. 1965 - DCO
 B. in Secondary Education (not indicated)
 B. S. in Accountancy G.R. No. 03 s. 1991 - DRO
 B. S. in Civil Engineering G.R. No. 926 s. 1985 - DRO
 B. S. in Commerce (not indicated)
 B. S. in Computer Science G.R. No. 03 s. 1997 - CRO
 B. S. in Criminology G.R. No. 17 s. 2001 - CRO
 B. S. in Office Administration G.R. No. 02 s. 1997 - CRO

Association
 Associate in Computer Technology G.R. No. 8-006 s. 1995 - DRO
 Associate in Office Administration G.R. No. 003 s. 1996 - CRO

Other Courses
 One-Year Automotive Mechanic Course
 Two-Year Special Vocational Secretarial Course

High School, Elementary & Pre-School
 Secondary (High School) Day G.R. No. 006 s. 2002 - DRO
 Secondary (High School) Night G.R. No. 66 s. 1977 - DCO
 Elementary G.R. No. 365 s. 1946 - DCO
 Pre-School G.R. No. 112 s. 1978 - DCO

See also
Colleges and Universities of Southern Leyte
List of universities and colleges in the Philippines

References

External links
 

Maasin
Educational institutions established in 1928
Universities and colleges in Southern Leyte
Liberal arts colleges in the Philippines
Catholic elementary schools in the Philippines
Catholic secondary schools in the Philippines
Catholic universities and colleges in the Philippines
1928 establishments in the Philippines